John McCurdy (1824 – 12 September 1885) was an Irish architect.

He received his professional training in the office of Frederick Darley, architect to Trinity College, Dublin. He succeeded Benjamin Holebrook as clerk of works at Trinity College in 1850. Shortly afterwards he became the official college architect, a post which he retained until his death. 

In 1872 he formed an architectural partnership with William Mansfield Mitchell, which was dissolved in 1882.

He was a member of the Royal Institute of British Architects and was president for the last ten years of his life of the Royal Institute of the Architects of Ireland. He was a member of the Grand Lodge of Ireland (Freemasons) and designed the Masonic Female Orphan School of Ireland (now a hotel) which opened in 1882 as well as the Shelbourne Hotel.

Bibliography
 M. Daly, M. Hearn & P. Pearson, Dublin's Victorian Houses (1998), pp. 160–161.

References

1824 births
1885 deaths
Architects from Dublin (city)
19th-century Irish architects
Irish Freemasons